Zefreh (also known as Zifreh) is a village in Zefreh Rural District, Sistan District, Kuhpayeh County, Isfahan Province, Iran. At the 2006 census, its population was 1,689.

Zefreh has a congregational mosque from the Saljuq era with subsequent renovations. Zefreh has four chains of subterranean channels (qanat). Most of the population is engaged in farming, herding, and gardening and horticulture. Agricultural products are wheat, almonds, mulberries, and especially corn. Weaving carpets, carrying the Nain design, was particular to women, who were also engaged in other cottage industries. A distinguished local industry used to be making cotton shoes.

References 

Populated places in Isfahan County